Goran Bogdanović is a Serbian politician who served as the Minister for Kosovo and Metohija in the Cabinet of Mirko Cvetković from 2008 to 2012.

Early years and education
He was born in 1963 in Raška and holds a degree from the University of Belgrade Faculty of Agriculture.

Professional career
From 1992 to 1996, he was manager of JUKO in Srbica. Afterwards held the position of as state agricultural inspector until 2002, before becoming Minister of Agriculture of Kosovo and Metohija and later on resuming the position of state agricultural inspector.

Bogdanović has been a member of the Demokratska Stranka since 2000 and leads the Party provincial committee. He was elected MP to the National Assembly of Serbia on 21 January 2007. On 7 July 2008, he was named Minister for Kosovo and Metohija. On 13 January 2010, he was stopped and then escorted by Kosovo Police to the Kosovo-Serbia border at Merdare, for "illegal political activities". In June 2012, he was banned from entering Kosovo for trying to enter "illegally".

Personal life
Bogdanović is married with two sons. He speaks Russian, English and his native Serbian.

Notes and references 
Notes:

References:

See also
 Politics of Serbia
 Autonomous Province of Kosovo and Metohija

External links
 Ministry of Kosovo and Metohija homepage

1963 births
Living people
People from Raška, Serbia
Democratic Party (Serbia) politicians
Members of the National Assembly (Serbia)
University of Belgrade Faculty of Agriculture alumni
Social Democratic Party (Serbia) politicians